Frank Rooney (born Frank Rovny, 1884–1977) was an Austro-Hungarian Major League Baseball infielder. He played for the Indianapolis Hoosiers during the  season. He was the first Czech player to homer in the major leagues.

He is buried in Hurley, Wisconsin.

References

External links

Major League Baseball infielders
Indianapolis Hoosiers players
Major League Baseball players from Austria-Hungary
1884 births
1977 deaths
Oshkosh Indians players
Cleveland Green Sox players
Peterborough Petes (baseball) players
Ottawa Senators (baseball) players
Hanover Raiders players
Fort Wayne Chiefs players
Portsmouth Truckers players
Fort Smith Twins players
Alexandria Reds players
Burials in Wisconsin
People from Poděbrady
Austro-Hungarian emigrants to the United States